The inaugural Mountain West Conference men's basketball tournament was played at the Thomas & Mack Center in Las Vegas, Nevada from March 9–11, 2000.  All eight member schools entered the three round tournament seeded according to their regular season league finish.

Host school and top seed UNLV won the tournament by beating 6th seed BYU 79–56. They were not awarded an automatic bid to the NCAA Tournament as the MWC did not have one this year. UNLV did receive an at-large invitation.

Bracket

References

Mountain West Conference men's basketball tournament
Tournament
Mountain West Conference men's basketball tournament
Mountain West Conference men's basketball tournament